Lee Seung-mo (born 30 March 1998) is a South Korean football defender who plays for Pohang Steelers. He won the gold medal with the South Korea national under-23 football team at the 2018 Asian Games.

Career

Lee started his career with Pohang Steelers.

References

External links 
 

1998 births
Living people
Association football defenders
South Korean footballers
Pohang Steelers players
Gwangju FC players
K League 1 players
K League 2 players
South Korea under-17 international footballers
South Korea under-20 international footballers
South Korea under-23 international footballers
Footballers at the 2018 Asian Games
Asian Games medalists in football
Asian Games gold medalists for South Korea
Medalists at the 2018 Asian Games
People from Paju
Sportspeople from Gyeonggi Province